Triadi is a village near Thermi, Thessaloniki regional unit, northern Greece. It belongs in the Municipality of Thermi and it has a population of 600 people.

See also
List of settlements in the Thessaloniki regional unit

Sources 
 http://bbs.keyhole.com/ubb/showthreaded.php?Number=948554

Populated places in Thessaloniki (regional unit)